Generation Wild is the title track and the first single to be released from Swedish glam metal band Crashdïet's 2010 album Generation Wild. It is the first single to feature the band's new singer, Simon Cruz, on vocals after their previous singer, H. Olliver Twisted, left in 2008.

Music video
In the video you get to see lead singer Simon Cruz being tortured by a girl who is supposed to be the "generation wild".  
Simon Cruz said in an interview: 

The Swedish singer Johan Palm also appears in the video.

Track listing
"Generation Wild" - 3:35 - (Cruz, Sweet, Young, London, RamPac)
"One of a Kind" - 4:37 - (Sweet, London, Gunn)
"Fear Control" - 4:12 - (Young, Sweet, Gunn)

Personnel
Simon Cruz - Vocals, rhythm guitar
Martin Sweet - Lead guitar
Peter London - Bass guitar
Eric Young - drums

References 

2010 singles
Songs written by Martin Sweet
Crashdïet songs
2009 songs
Songs written by Johan Ramström
Songs written by Patrik Magnusson